Bomberman is a video game franchise originally developed by Hudson Soft.

Bomberman may also refer to:

 Bomberman (1983 video game), the first video game in the series
 Bomberman (1990 video game), a 1990 video game
 Bomberman (2005 video game), a 2005 game for the Nintendo DS
 Bomberman (2006 video game), a 2006 video game for the PlayStation Portable
 Other Bomberman video games